Lyendecker Lake is a lake in Clearwater County, Minnesota, in the United States.

Lyendecker Lake was named for a travel companion of Jacob V. Brower.

See also
List of lakes in Minnesota

References

Lakes of Minnesota
Lakes of Clearwater County, Minnesota